Concrete, in perfumery, is a semi-solid mass obtained by solvent extraction of fresh plant material.

Sources 
Concretes are produced mainly from flowers (e. g. rose, jasmine, tuberose, jonquil, ylang-ylang), but also from other plant materials (e. g. lavender, lavandin, geranium, clary sage).

Production 
Fresh plant material is extracted with nonpolar solvents (e. g., benzene, toluene, hexane, petroleum ether). On evaporation of the solvent, a semi-solid residue of essential oils, waxes, resins and other lipophilic (oil-soluble) plant chemicals remains.

Subjecting the plant materials to high pressure before treating it with solvents has been found to greatly increase the yield of the concrete.

Uses 
The resulting residue after evaporation consists mostly of heavier nonvolatile substances like waxes and resins, which gives a concrete its "waxy" properties. Because of these nonvolatile substances, concretes are only partially soluble in ethanol. Therefore, they are of limited use in perfumery, but they can be employed for scenting soaps. The concrete may be extracted with ethanol to produce an absolute.

The underlying issue with using concretes in perfumery is that their extracts can become rancid after several months, especially if the containers are exposed to strong light.

References 

Perfumery
Chemical mixtures